Salix salviifolia is a shrub in the willow family.

Characteristics
It is a shrub 1 to 3 m high. It has grayish pubescent branches.

The leaves are of a moderate width, more or less elliptical or oblanceolate, whitish. They have the underside with a fluff of hair that gives it a whitish appearance.

The twigs have dense but short hairs.

Distribution
It is an endemic of the Iberian Peninsula, where it is found in the center and in the western half. Abundant in the Central System, Montes de Toledo, Sierra Morena, Extremadura, Duero depression, Tagus depression, Guadiana depression.

Taxonomy
Salix salviifolia was described by Viktor Ferdinand Brotherus and published in Fl. Lusit. 1: 29, 1804.

References

Salix
Endemic flora of the Iberian Peninsula